Budineh (also Romanized as Būdīneh) is a village in Heshmatabad Rural District, in the Central District of Dorud County, Lorestan Province, Iran. At the 2006 census, its population was 76, in 19 families.

References 

Towns and villages in Dorud County